The Saint Louis Brewery, otherwise commonly known as Schlafly Beer, is a craft brewery based in St. Louis, Missouri. As St. Louis’ largest independent craft brewery, Schlafly Beer brews more than 60 styles of beer. There are three brewpubs in which Schlafly Beer operates: the Schlafly Tap Room and Schlafly Bottleworks located in Maplewood, Missouri, and the Schlafly Bankside located in St Charles, Missouri, which opened in 2020.

History

Lawyer and co-founder Tom Schlafly proposed the idea to bring traditional styles of beer to the United States to his friend Charles Kopman, a fellow lawyer. Kopman then introduced Schlafly to his son, Dan Kopman, who had worked at a British brewery and had extensive knowledge in the field. Dan was privy to the idea of starting a microbrewery, but Schlafly was concerned as Anheuser-Busch had the beer market cornered. On August 22, 1989, Schlafly began the incorporation process. Due to Missouri’s legal restrictions, Schlafly opened its first brewpub - a small brewery with an adjoining restaurant that only sold its beer on-premises. On December 26, 1991, the Schlafly Tap Room opened its doors to the public. A few weeks later, The Saint Louis Brewery completely ran out of beer.

With Kopman and Schlafly’s plan to open a brewpub came struggles with Missouri law. Following Prohibition, Missouri lawmakers introduced a three-tier system to prevent the perceived dangers of breweries owning and controlling taverns which would, in turn, decrease competition. This law made it illegal for any brewery to hold a retail liquor license, thus making it impossible to distribute beyond brewery-restaurants.

In the fall of 1992, Schlafly began meeting with various lawmakers and drafted an amendment to the Missouri Microbrewery law. By January 1993, the amendment was heard in court along with a bill to sell beer on Sundays in grocery and convenience stores. After negotiations with senators and meetings with Anheuser-Busch, the amendment seemed to be coming to fruition. In May 1993, the amendment had been rewritten “behind closed doors” decreasing the maximum barrel production from 17,500 barrels to 10,000. However, Kopman and Schlafly continued on and began selling their beer in St. Louis area establishments. The increase in local consumers led to a demand for bottled beer, but the barrel capacity limited production quantities. In 1996, Schlafly hired a contract brewery in Minnesota to brew and bottle for Schlafly styles and in June, bottles entered the St. Louis market.

In 1997, Schlafly again wanted to amend the law but found that a new liquor license would change the way Schlafly distributed and sold beer. Later that year, Schlafly was first sold in Busch Stadium and found its way into other establishments in the St. Louis area.

The Schlafly Tap Room
In 1989, Schlafly and Kopman began brainstorming locations for The Saint Louis Brewery. After careful consideration, the pair landed on Locust Street. They decided to buy a historic building previously owned by John S. Swift, home of Swift Printing Company. The building was authentically built and had even appeared on the National Register of Historic Places but had suffered fire damage in 1976. Schlafly renovated it and opened its doors on December 26, 1991.

Schlafly Bottleworks

In 2001, Schlafly decided it was time to expand to a bigger brewery, expanding its brewing capacity. Looking to refurbish an abandoned supermarket, Kopman and Schlafly chose an empty supermarket in Maplewood, Missouri. On April 7, 2003, Schlafly Bottleworks opened its doors to the public for tours, dinner, and beers at the bar.

Trademark lawsuit 
In 2011, the brewery applied for a trademark on the Schlafly name. Relatives of the conservative Phyllis Schlafly filed a lawsuit, led by her son Andrew Schlafly, an attorney and cousin of the founders. In 2018, the U.S. Federal Circuit Court of Appeals ruled in favor of The Saint Louis Brewery.

Awards  
 Gold Medal for Best German-style Kölsch in the World Beer Cup in 2010.
 Silver Medal in the Pumpkin/Squash Beer or Pumpkin Spice Beer category for its Pumpkin Ale in 2017 at the Great American Beer Festival.

References 

Beer brewing companies based in St. Louis
Restaurants in St. Louis
Drinking establishments in Missouri